Calliostoma rosewateri, common name Rosewater's top shell, is a species of sea snail, a marine gastropod mollusk in the family Calliostomatidae.

Description
The size of the shell varies between 30 mm and 40 mm.

Distribution
This species occurs off the Lesser Antilles and in the Caribbean Sea off Colombia at depths between 270 m and 420 m..

References

 Clench, W. J. and R. D. Turner. 1960. The genus Calliostoma in the Western Atlantic. Johnsonia 4: 1-80

External links
 To Encyclopedia of Life
 To USNM Invertebrate Zoology Mollusca Collection
 To World Register of Marine Species

rosewateri
Gastropods described in 1960